Steven Hall (born 17 September 1972, in Johannesburg) is a former French rugby union player. He played as a lock and occasionally number eight.

He played for AS Béziers where he won Rugby Pro D2 in 2000. He earned his first cap with the French national team on 2 February 2002 against Italy at Stade de France. With the French national team he played as number eight.

External links 
 http://www.espnscrum.com/statsguru/rugby/player/13335.html
 http://www.ercrugby.com/fra/statistiques/archives_joueurs.php?player=1981&includeref=dynamic

Living people
French rugby union players
France international rugby union players
1972 births
Rugby union players from Johannesburg
Rugby union locks
Rugby union number eights
South African expatriate sportspeople in France
Expatriate rugby union players in France
South African expatriate rugby union players
Naturalized citizens of France
AS Béziers Hérault players
Aviron Bayonnais players